Viola Fauver Liuzzo (née Gregg; April 11, 1925 – March 25, 1965) was an American civil rights activist. In March 1965, Liuzzo heeded the call of Martin Luther King Jr. and traveled from Detroit, Michigan, to Selma, Alabama, in the wake of the Bloody Sunday attempt at marching across the Edmund Pettus Bridge. Liuzzo participated in the successful Selma to Montgomery marches and helped with coordination and logistics. At the age of 39, while driving back from a trip shuttling fellow activists to the Montgomery airport, she was fatally hit by shots fired from a pursuing car containing Ku Klux Klan members Collie Wilkins, William Eaton, Eugene Thomas, and Gary Thomas Rowe, the last of whom was actually an undercover informant working for the Federal Bureau of Investigation (FBI). Although the State of Alabama was unable to secure a murder conviction, Wilkins, Eaton, and Thomas were charged in federal court with conspiracy to intimidate African Americans under the 1871 Ku Klux Klan Act, a Reconstruction civil rights statute. On December 3, the trio was found guilty by an all-white, all-male jury, and were sentenced to ten years in prison, a landmark in Southern legal history.

Rowe testified that Wilkins had fired two shots into Liuzzo on the order of Thomas, and was placed in the witness protection program by the FBI. In an effort to deflect attention from having employed Rowe as an informant, the FBI produced disinformation for politicians and the press, stating that Liuzzo was a member of the Communist Party, heroin addict, and had abandoned her children to have sexual relationships with African-Americans involved in the Civil Rights Movement. Liuzzo's involvement in the civil rights movement was scrutinized and she was condemned by various racist organizations. In 1983, the Liuzzo family filed a lawsuit against the FBI after learning about the FBI's activities, but the suit was dismissed.

In addition to other honors, Liuzzo's name is today inscribed on the Civil Rights Memorial in Montgomery, Alabama, created by Maya Lin.

Early life
Viola Fauver Gregg was born on April 11, 1925, in the small town of California, Pennsylvania, the elder daughter of Eva Wilson, a teacher, and Heber Ernest Gregg, a coal miner and World War I veteran. Her father left school in the eighth grade but taught himself to read. Her mother had a teaching certificate from Southwestern PA  Normal School (now California University of Pennsylvania). The couple had one other daughter, Rose Mary, in 1930. While on the job, Heber's right hand was blown off in a mine explosion and, during the Great Depression, the Greggs became solely dependent on Eva's income. Work was very hard to come by for Mrs. Gregg, as she could pick up only sporadic, short-term teaching positions. The family descended further into poverty and decided to move from Georgia to Chattanooga, Tennessee, where Eva found a teaching position, when Viola was six.

The family was very poor and lived in one-room shacks with no running water. The schools Liuzzo attended did not have adequate supplies and the teachers were too busy to give extra attention to children in need. Because the family moved so often, Liuzzo never began and ended the school year in the same place. Having spent much of her childhood and adolescence poor in Tennessee, Viola experienced the segregated nature of the South firsthand. This would have a powerful impact on her activism.

Michigan
In 1941, the Gregg family moved to Ypsilanti, Michigan, where her father sought a job assembling bombs at the Ford Motor Co. Viola's strong-willed nature led her to drop out of high school after one year, and elope at the age of 16. The marriage did not last and she returned to her family. Two years later, the Gregg family moved to Detroit, Michigan, which was starkly segregated by race.  Tensions between whites and blacks were very high there and the early 1940s saw violence and rioting.  Witnessing these horrific ordeals was a major motivator that influenced Viola's future civil rights work.

In 1943, she married George Argyris, the manager of a restaurant where she worked. They had two children, Penny and Evangeline Mary, and divorced in 1949. She later married Anthony Liuzzo, a Teamsters union business agent. They had three children: Tommy, Anthony Jr., and Sally.  Liuzzo sought to return to school, and attended the Carnegie Institute in Detroit, Michigan. She then enrolled part-time at Wayne State University in 1962.

In 1964, she began attending the First Unitarian Universalist Church of Detroit, and joined the National Association for the Advancement of Colored People (NAACP).

A large part of Viola's activism, particularly with the NAACP, was due to her close friendship with an African-American woman, Sarah Evans. After initially meeting in a grocery store where Liuzzo worked as a cashier, the two kept in touch. Evans eventually became Liuzzo's housekeeper while still maintaining a close, friendly relationship in which they shared similar views, including support for the civil rights movement. In the aftermath of Liuzzo's death, Evans would go on to become the permanent caretaker of Liuzzo's five young children.

Liuzzo so passionately believed in the fight for civil rights that she helped organize Detroit protests, attended civil rights conferences, and worked with the NAACP. She had a strong desire to make a difference on as large a scale as she could.

Local activism
In addition to actively supporting the civil rights movement, Liuzzo was also notable for her protest against Detroit's laws that allowed for students to more easily drop out of school. Her disagreement with that law led her to withdraw her children from school in protest. Because she deliberately home-schooled them for two months, Liuzzo was arrested, but did not waver. She pleaded guilty in court and was placed on probation.

Selma
In February 1965, a night demonstration for voting rights at the Marion, Alabama, courthouse turned violent. State troopers clubbed marchers and beat and shot a 26-year-old African-American named Jimmie Lee Jackson, who later died. His death spurred the fight for civil rights in Selma, Alabama. The Southern Christian Leadership Conference (SCLC) scheduled a protest march for Sunday, March 7, 1965. Gov. George Wallace banned the march, but the ban was ignored. Six hundred marchers headed for the arched Edmund Pettus Bridge that crossed the Alabama River. As the protesters reached the crest of the bridge, they saw state troopers armed with clubs, whips, and teargas, and a sheriff's posse on horseback. When told to stop and disperse, the marchers refused. The troopers advanced on the marchers, clubbing and whipping them, fracturing bones and gashing heads. Seventeen people were hospitalized on the day later called "Bloody Sunday."

Liuzzo was horrified by the images of the aborted march on Bloody Sunday. A second march took place March 9. Troopers, police, and marchers confronted each other at the county end of the bridge, but when the troopers stepped aside to let them pass, the Rev. Martin Luther King Jr. led the marchers back to the church. He was obeying a federal injunction while seeking protection from federal court for the march. That night, a white group beat and murdered civil rights activist James Reeb, a Unitarian Universalist minister from Boston, who had come to Selma to march with the second group. Many other clergy and sympathizers from across the country also gathered for the second march.

On March 16, Liuzzo took part in a protest at Wayne State. She then called her husband to tell him she would be traveling to Selma after hearing the Rev Dr. Martin Luther King Jr. call for people of all faiths to come and help, saying that the struggle "was everybody's fight." Leaving her children in the care of family and friends, she contacted the Southern Christian Leadership Conference who took her on and tasked her with delivering aid to various locations, welcoming and recruiting volunteers and transporting volunteers and marchers to and from airports, bus terminals, and train stations, for which she volunteered the use of her car, a 1963 Oldsmobile.

On March 21, 1965, more than 3,000 people began the third march, including blacks, whites, doctors, nurses, working-class people, priests, nuns, rabbis, homemakers, students, actors, and farmers. Many famous people participated, including Martin Luther King Jr., Ralph Bunche, Coretta Scott King, Ralph Abernathy, and Andrew Young. It took five days for the protesters to reach their goal. Liuzzo marched the first full day and returned to Selma for the night. That Wednesday, March 24, she rejoined the march four miles from the end, where a "Night of the Stars" celebration was held the City of St. Jude with performances by many popular entertainers of the day, including Harry Belafonte, Sammy Davis, Jr., Joan Baez, and Dick Gregory. Liuzzo helped at the first aid station. On Thursday, Liuzzo and other marchers reached the state capitol building, with a Confederate flag flying above it. Martin Luther King Jr. addressed the crowd of 25,000, calling the march a "shining moment in American history."

Death
After the third march concluded on March 25, Liuzzo, assisted by Leroy Moton, a 19-year-old African American, continued shuttling marchers and volunteers from Montgomery back to Selma in her car. Liuzzo was warned by a veteran of the SCLC, James Orange, that it was dangerous and that she should not go out to Montgomery. As they were driving along Route 80, a car tried to force them off the road. After dropping passengers in Selma, she and Moton headed back to Montgomery. As they were getting gas at a local filling station, they were subject to abusive calls and racist scorn. When Liuzzo stopped at a red light, a car with four members of the local Ku Klux Klan, including FBI infiltrator Rowe, pulled up alongside her. When they saw a white woman and a black man in a car together, they followed Liuzzo as she tried to outrun them. Overtaking the Oldsmobile, they shot directly at Liuzzo, mortally wounding her twice in the head. The car veered into a ditch, crashing into a fence.

Although Moton was covered with blood, the bullets missed him. He lay motionless when the Klansmen reached the car to check on their victims. After the Klansmen left, Moton began searching for help, and eventually flagged down a truck driven by Rev. Leon Riley. Like Moton and Liuzzo, Riley was shuttling civil rights workers back to Selma.

Liuzzo's funeral was held at Immaculate Heart of Mary Catholic Church on March 30 in Detroit, with many prominent members of both the civil rights movement and government there to pay their respects. Included in this group were Martin Luther King Jr., NAACP executive director Roy Wilkins, Congress on Racial Equality national leader James Farmer, Michigan lieutenant governor William G. Milliken, Teamsters president Jimmy Hoffa, and United Auto Workers president Walter Reuther. She was buried at Holy Sepulchre Cemetery in Southfield, Michigan.

Less than two weeks after her death, a charred cross was found in front of four Detroit homes, including the Liuzzo residence.

Arrest and legal proceedings
The four Klan members in the car—Collie Wilkins (21), FBI informant Gary Rowe (34), William Eaton (41), and Eugene Thomas (42)—were quickly arrested; within 24 hours, President Lyndon Johnson appeared on national television to announce their arrest. In order to avoid bad press, President Johnson made sure to focus on the positive work of the FBI agents' solving of the murder of Viola Liuzzo, in an attempt to divert scrutiny away from the fact that one of the men in the car, Gary Thomas Rowe Jr., was an FBI informant and therefore protected by the FBI.

Wilkins, Eaton, and Thomas were indicted in the State of Alabama for Liuzzo's death on April 22. FBI informant Rowe was not indicted and served as a witness. Rowe testified that Wilkins had fired two shots on the order of Thomas.

The next phase of the lengthy process began when a federal trial charged the defendants with conspiracy to intimidate African Americans under the 1871 Ku Klux Klan Act, a Reconstruction civil rights statute. The charges did not specifically refer to Liuzzo's murder. On December 3, the trio was found guilty by an all-white, all-male jury, and were sentenced to ten years in prison, a landmark in Southern legal history.

While out on appeal, Wilkins and Thomas were each found guilty of firearms violations and sent to jail for those crimes. During this period, the January 15, 1966, edition of the Birmingham News published an ad offering Liuzzo's bullet-ridden car for sale. Asking $3,500, the ad read, "Do you need a crowd-getter? I have a 1963 Oldsmobile two-door in which Mrs. Viola Liuzzo was killed. Bullet holes and everything intact. Ideal to bring in crowds."

After all three defendants were convicted of the federal charges, state murder cases proceeded against Eaton and Thomas. Eaton, the only defendant who remained out of jail, died of a heart attack on March 9. Thomas's state murder trial—the final trial—got under way on September 26, 1966. The prosecution built a strong circumstantial case in the trial that included an FBI ballistics expert testifying that the bullet removed from the woman's brain had been fired from a revolver owned by Thomas. Two witnesses testified they had seen Wilkins drinking beer at a VFW Hall near Birmingham, 125 miles from the murder scene, an hour or less after Liuzzo was shot. Despite the presence of eight African Americans on the jury, Thomas was acquitted of the state murder charge the following day after just 90 minutes of deliberations. State attorney general Richmond Flowers, Sr. criticized the verdict, deriding the black members of the panel, who had been carefully screened, as "Uncle Toms."

On April 27, 1967, the Fifth Circuit Court of Appeals in New Orleans upheld the federal convictions of the surviving defendants. Thomas served six years in prison for the crime. Due to threats from the Klan, both before and after his testimony, Gary Thomas Rowe went into the federal witness protection program. Rowe died in 1998 in Savannah, Georgia, after having lived several decades under several assumed identities.

FBI cover-up and leaks
Within 24 hours of Liuzzo's assassination by the Ku Klux Klan and the FBI's informant Gary Thomas Rowe, J. Edgar Hoover began a smear campaign to the press, to subordinate FBI agents and to select politicians, claiming the cut marks from the car's shattered window were "puncture marks in her arm indicating recent use of a hypodermic needle; she was sitting very, very close to that negro in the car; that it has the appearance of a necking party."

While attempting to obscure the fact that an FBI informant was in the car, and to ensure that the FBI was not held responsible for permitting their informant to participate in violent acts, without FBI surveillance or backup, the FBI was concerned that they might be held accountable for their informant's (Rowe) role in the death. Rowe had been an informant for the FBI since 1960. The FBI was aware that Rowe had participated in acts of violence during Ku Klux Klan activities. Some of these activities include organizing and participating in the Freedom Riders attack in 1961, and playing a role in the bombing of the Sixteenth Street Baptist Church in Birmingham in 1963. On the day of Liuzzo's death, prior to the shooting, Rowe had called his FBI contact and notified him that Rowe and other Klansman were traveling to Montgomery, and that violence was planned. During the investigation, the FBI did not test Rowe’s gun or the bullet casings for his fingerprints. 

Autopsy testing in 1965 showed no traces of drugs in Liuzzo's system, and that she had not had sex recently at the time of death. The FBI's role in the smear campaign was uncovered in 1978, when Liuzzo's children obtained case documents from the FBI under the Freedom of Information Act.

Legislation and subsequent lawsuits

Liuzzo was condemned by different racist organizations for having brought her death upon herself. At the time, Liuzzo's choice to immerse herself in such a dangerous undertaking was seen by some as radical and controversial. However, of all the deaths to occur during the campaign, Liuzzo's was the only one scrutinized in such a way, where male activists who were killed were recognized as heroes.

Rowe was indicted in 1978 and tried for his involvement in the murder. The first trial ended in a hung jury, and the second trial ended in his acquittal.

On May 27, 1983, Judge Charles Wycliffe Joiner rejected the claims in the Liuzzo family lawsuit, saying there was "no evidence the FBI was in any type of joint venture with Rowe or conspiracy against Mrs. Liuzzo. Rowe's presence in the car was the principal reason why the crime was solved so quickly." In response to the verdict, Liuzzo family lawyer Dean A. Robb said "This is a terrible opinion. I'm shocked. I think this is incredible." In August 1983, the FBI was awarded $79,873 in court costs, but costs were later reduced to $3,645 after the ACLU appealed on behalf of the family.

The Walter P. Reuther Library contains original archival material surrounding Liuzzo and her case. The Viola Liuzzo Papers contain documentation of the events which surrounded the murder, the resulting investigation, and the later legal involvement of the Liuzzo Family. The papers contain FBI murder investigation files and completed Freedom of Information and Privacy Act (FOIPA) requests for the release of documents which describe the FBI's involvement with the Ku Klux Klan. Several documents are related to the Freedom Riders.

Liuzzo was featured in part 3 of a series of videos, Free at Last: Civil Rights Heroes.

Her murder was shown in Episode 2 of the King miniseries.

Viola Liuzzo Park is located at Winthrop and Trojan in Detroit.

Liuzzo has her name included as part of the Civil Rights Memorial, a monument in Montgomery, Alabama, created by Maya Lin.

In 2004, Liuzzo was the subject of a documentary, Home of the Brave.

In 2008, Liuzzo's story was memorialized in a song, "Color Blind Angel," by the late blues singer Robin Rogers on her album Treat Me Right.

Episode 3 of the sixth season of the CBS crime drama Cold Case was loosely based on Liuzzo's story.

In 2011, the Viola Liuzzo Ethics Scholarship was started at Adrian College by her grandson, Joshua James Liuzzo.

In 2014, Outside Agitators was written by 20% Theater's Artistic Associate, Laura Nessler. Inspired by and based on Liuzzo's story, the play premiered at the Prop Theater in Chicago, Illinois, on September 20.

Liuzzo was played by Tara Ochs in the 2014 film Selma.

In 2015, Wayne State University bestowed its first posthumous honorary doctorate degree to Liuzzo.

In 2019, a statue which honors Liuzzo's memory was unveiled in Detroit.

In 2021, Michigan Secretary of State Jocelyn Benson began to re-issue the 1965 Winter/Water Wonderland license plates, as one of them was on Liuzzo's car when she drove from Detroit to Alabama. On November 1, 2022, in an interview with Eric Lloyd of News 9 and 10, Benson revealed that she re-issued the plate in homage to Viola Liuzzo. Secretary Benson explained she started her career in Montgomery, Alabama and was moved by Liuzzo's advocacy and untimely death to ensure that all people had a right to vote.

See also

 List of unsolved murders
 Lynching in the United States

Notes

References
 Hoods: The Story of the Ku Klux Klan by Robert P. Ingalls. New York: G.P. Putnam's Sons, 1979.
 From Selma to Sorrow: The Life and Death of Viola Liuzzo by Mary Stanton. Athens: University of Georgia Press, 1998. 
 Murder on the Highway: The Viola Liuzzo Story by Beatrice Siegel
 The many deaths of Viola Liuzzo – 1965 murder of civil rights worker by Jared Taylor
 Children of the Movement, by John Blake, Chicago Review Press, 2007, 
 Viola Liuzzo and the gendered politics of Martyrdom, by Jonathan L. Entin, Chicago Harvard Women's Law Journal, 2000, Volume 23, p. 249
 Vindicating Viola Liuzzo: murdered by the Klan, demonized by the FBI, and disgraced by the press, Viola Liuzzo sacrificed life and legacy for civil rights by Mary Stanton. Alabama Heritage, 1998.
 The Informant: The FBI, The Ku Klux Klan, and the Murder of Viola Liuzzo. by Gary May. New Haven: Yale University Press, 2005.

Further reading

External links
 Viola Liuzzo biography at the Dictionary of Unitarian & Universalist Biography
 Viola Liuzzo. Story of the civil rights activist assassinated by KKK in 1965
Viola Liuzzo article, Encyclopedia of Alabama
  (from the Detroit News web site)
FBI file on Viola Liuzzo 
 Documentary film Home of the Brave
 Activist website for Home of the Brave and Viola Liuzzo
  Short video slideshow created by Viola Liuzzo's daughter
 Historical Marker Database – Viola Liuzzo
 Details of Rowe's prosecution
 Killed For Taking Part In 'Everybody's Fight' from NPR's Codeswitch

1925 births
1965 murders in the United States
1965 deaths
Activists for African-American civil rights
Activists from Detroit
American murder victims
American pacifists
American Unitarian Universalists
Assassinated American civil rights activists
Women civil rights activists
Civil rights movement
COINTELPRO targets
Deaths by firearm in Alabama
Female murder victims
Ku Klux Klan crimes in Alabama
People from California, Pennsylvania
People murdered in Alabama
Selma to Montgomery marches
Unsolved murders in the United States
Wayne State University alumni